Wink Memories 1988–1996 is the sixth compilation album by Japanese idol duo Wink, released by Polystar on March 25, 1996. The two-disc album compiles all of the duo's singles from 1988 to 1995. A limited edition release included a bonus karaoke CD. This was the duo's final release before they officially disbanded six days later on March 31.

The album peaked at No. 35 on Oricon's albums chart and sold over 22,000 copies.

Track listing

Charts

References

External links 
 

1996 compilation albums
Wink (duo) compilation albums
Japanese-language compilation albums